The Goblin Gate (2010) is a young adult fantasy novel by Hilari Bell, a sequel to her novel The Goblin Wood. The story picks up immediately after the end of the previous novel with young knight Jeriah trying to save his older brother Tobin from the goblins and the hedgewitch Makenna. After Tobin escorts Makenna to the Otherworld Jeriah learns his brother will soon die due to the magical nature of the world he has fled to. To bring back his brother Jeriah is quickly involved in the complex politics and conspiracies of the Realm.

Reception
Kirkus Reviews finds that "Suspense is almost painful..." and concludes that "Fantasy readers, male and female alike, will gobble this book up..."

References

External links
 The author’s website

2010 American novels

American fantasy novels
American young adult novels
Young adult fantasy novels
HarperCollins books